Nothing Wrong is the third studio album by British rock band Red Lorry Yellow Lorry, released in 1988. It was their first LP on the Beggars Banquet offshoot, Situation Two, in the UK. In the US it was released by Beggars Banquet/RCA. The US version included two bonus tracks, the UK single "Open Up" (previously chosen by New Musical Express as a Single of the Week) and the B-side "The Rise". The album's title track and "Only Dreaming (Wide Awake)" were issued as singles in the UK. Nothing Wrong featured some occasional audio excerpts from Sir Laurens Van Der Post's BBC television series documentary Testament to a Bushmen (stills from which were used as the source of the album's front and back covers). The album included a version of Booker T. & the M.G.'s' "Time Is Tight".

Track listing 
 "Nothing Wrong" – 2:37
 "Open Up" – 3:26
 "Hands Off Me" – 2:31
 "Big Stick" – 2:39
 "She Said" – 2:53
 "Sayonara" – 3:32
 "World Around" – 2:18
 "Hard-Away" – 2:40
 "The Rise" – 2:46
 "Only Dreaming" (Wide Awake) – 4:24
 "Do You Understand?" – 2:18
 "Never Know" – 3:29
 "Pushing On" – 2:50
 "Time Is Tight" – :52

All tracks were written by Chris Reed (lyrics) and Reed/Dave Wolfenden/Leon Phillips (music), except for "Time Is Tight", written by Steve Cropper/Booker T. Jones/Donald Dunn/Al Jackson.

Personnel 
 Chris Reed - vocals, guitar, keyboards
 David "Wolfie" Wolfenden - guitar
 Leon Phillips - bass guitar, keyboards

References 

Nothing Wrong
Nothing Wrong
Beggars Banquet Records albums
Situation Two albums